Scott Bothic Rae is an American Old Testament scholar, theologian, and professor of Christian ethics. He serves as dean of the faculty and chair of the department of philosophy at Biola University's Talbot School of Theology. In 2014, Rae was elected to serve a term as president of the Evangelical Theological Society. He is a senior fellow for The Center for Bioethics & Human Dignity.

Rae earned his B.A.S. in economics from Southern Methodist University (1976), his Th.M. in Old Testament from Dallas Theological Seminary (1981), and his Ph.D. in social ethics from the University of Southern California (1992). Prior to beginning his tenure at Talbot School of Theology in 1989, he served as an associate pastor for five years at Mariners Church and for five years before that as an instructor in Old Testament at the International School of Theology in San Bernardino, California.

Publications
Rae has authored or coauthored over 11 books, including:

 (Review)
 (Review)

References

Year of birth missing (living people)
Living people
American theologians
Southern Methodist University alumni
Dallas Theological Seminary alumni
University of Southern California alumni
Biola University faculty
Christian ethicists